Liam James Cross (born 8 April 2003) is an English professional footballer who plays as a midfielder for Leamington on loan from  side Northampton Town.

Career
After graduating through Northampton Town's youth academy, he made his senior debut for the club in the final match of the 2020–21 season as a 79th-minute substitute in a 1–1 draw with Sunderland. Following the end of the season, he was offered a professional contract with the club.

On 13 August 2021, Cross along with team mate Josh Flanagan, signed for St Ives Town on a one-month loan deal.

Cross signed for Southern League Premier Division Central side Tamworth on 29 November 2021 on a one-month loan deal. Cross made his Southern League Premier Central debut for Tamworth on 30 November 2021, starting against Biggleswade Town in an away fixture, Cross was however withdrawn on the 56th minute for Charlie Shaw, following a red card for team mate Jack Thomas, the match finished 2-2.

On 28 January 2022, he returned to St Ives Town on a second month-long loan.

On 24 November 2022, Cross joined National League North side Leamington on a one-month loan deal.

References

External links

Liam Cross at aylesburyunitedfc.co.uk

2003 births
Living people
English footballers
Association football midfielders
Northampton Town F.C. players
St Ives Town F.C. players
Tamworth F.C. players
Leamington F.C. players
English Football League players
National League (English football) players
Southern Football League players